Retezat can refer to:
 Retezat National Park, Romania
 Retezat Mountains, Romania